Lichtenfeld is a German language habitational surname. Notable people with the name include:
 Gabriel Judah Lichtenfeld (1811–1887), Jewish-Polish maskilic mathematician, poet, and author
 Gerhard Lichtenfeld (1921–1978), German sculptor and academic teacher
 Herbert Lichtenfeld (1927–2001), German television writer
 Imi Lichtenfeld (1910–1998), Hungarian-born Israeli martial artist

References 

German-language surnames
Jewish surnames
Toponymic surnames
Surnames from ornamental names